Denis Rehák (born May 14, 1985) is a Slovak professional ice hockey player who currently plays for Yertis Pavlodar of the Kazakhstan Hockey Championship. He was selected by the New York Islanders in the 7th round (212th overall) of the 2003 NHL Entry Draft.

Rehák played with HC Vítkovice in the Czech Extraliga during the 2010–11 Czech Extraliga season.

Career statistics

References

External links

1985 births
Living people
HC Nové Zámky players
HC Vítkovice players
HK Dubnica players
HK Dukla Trenčín players
HKM Zvolen players
MHk 32 Liptovský Mikuláš players
MsHK Žilina players
New York Islanders draft picks
Prince George Cougars players
SK Horácká Slavia Třebíč players
Slovak ice hockey defencemen
Yertis Pavlodar players
Sportspeople from Trenčín
Slovak expatriate ice hockey players in Canada
Slovak expatriate ice hockey players in the Czech Republic
Slovak expatriate sportspeople in Kazakhstan
Expatriate ice hockey players in Kazakhstan